Smuttynose Brewing Company is a craft brewery located on Towle Farm in Hampton, New Hampshire, United States. The company takes its name from Smuttynose Island, one of the Isles of Shoals. Smuttynose beers are all unfiltered and known for their distinctive labels, many of which feature original photography. Their beer is distributed in 25 states and 11 countries. The Towle Farm campus has been certified LEED Gold by the U.S. Green Building Council.

In March 2018, the company was sold at auction and subsequently purchased by Runnymede Investments of North Hampton, New Hampshire.

History 

Smuttynose was founded in 1994 in Portsmouth, New Hampshire. Founder Peter Egelston and his sister, Janet, had opened the Northampton Brewery in 1987 and the Portsmouth Brewery in 1991. They acquired the assets of a small, short-lived microbrewery in a warehouse on the southern edge of town. Early partners Paul Sylva and Jim Beauvais, founders of Ipswich Brewery, were quickly bought out. The first Smuttynose pints were poured on July 14, 1994, along Portsmouth's historic waterfront. Portsmouth mayor Eileen Foley toasted the new brewery with sixteen ounces of Shoals Pale Ale, the brewery's initial offering.

Location acquisition 
In 2004, Smuttynose began looking for the site of its new home in Newmarket, New Hampshire, but the deal fell through in late 2005. Subsequently, Smuttynose begins working on plans to build a new brewery on a  parcel along U.S. Route 1 in Portsmouth, but the project met community opposition and was abandoned.

The company's annual production volume surpassed 15,000 barrels in 2006. Gross sales for Smuttynose Brewing Company in 2009 reached $5.7 million. The following year, construction began on Smuttynose's new home on the historic  Towle Farm in Hampton, New Hampshire.

The final capacity expansion at the original brewery was commissioned in 2012. Total production in 2012 was 40,744 barrels. Smuttynose officially moved to the Towle Farm headquarters in 2014. The facility was opened to the public on May 29. The facility featured a four-vessel, 100hl, automated brew house, state-of-the-art bottle-filling equipment, tours, tastings and a nine-hole disc golf course.

In 2016 Smuttynose received LEED Gold certification from the U.S. Green Building Council, making it the second and largest brewery to receive the seal at the time.

Bank auction 
On January 18, Smuttynose announced a bank auction of the brewery to be held on March 9, 2018, unless a buyer or partner were found. Key factors of the company's financial challenges were a slowdown in the growth of craft beer sales, and a switch in consumer preference from beer in bottles to beer in cans. On March 9, lender The Provident Bank purchased the company at auction for $8.25 million. On March 16, Runnymede Investments said that it had purchased the company from The Provident Bank for an undisclosed amount.

Smuttlabs 
Smuttlabs evolved from the Short Batch series of single brew batches of classic beers styles, experimental techniques, or unusual ingredients. When Smuttynose moved to the Towle Farm brewery, Smuttlabs took over the original Portsmouth facility, giving it a range of options for batch size, contract brewing capacity and the ability to allow Smuttlabs beer the time they need to age and condition. Smuttlabs beers, like the Short Weisse beers, can also move to other parts of the portfolio. As of early 2016, all Smuttlabs releases are exclusively allocated through the Beer Vault, where bars and restaurants can choose any available beers in the available.

See also
List of microbreweries

References

Further reading

External links
 Official site

Beer brewing companies based in New Hampshire
Hampton, New Hampshire
Companies based in Rockingham County, New Hampshire
Food and drink companies established in 1994
1994 establishments in New Hampshire